Lanes are narrow roads.

Lanes may also refer to:

 Willian Lanes de Lima (born 1985), Brazilian footballer

See also

 Lane (disambiguation)
 Laner
 Laning (disambiguation)
 The Lanes